Laïla Abid (born March 21, 1977 in Meknes, Morocco) is a Moroccan-Dutch journalist, and former television news presenter and news anchor. Since 2017, Abid has been working in PR and communication. She studied journalism and between 2001 and 2003 at Hogeschool van Utrecht, earning her bachelor's degree in 2003, after earning an associate degree in English from the Hogeschool van Amsterdam in 1998. She would earn her master's degree from the Vrije Universiteit Amsterdam in 2008.

In 2008 Abid worked as a newscaster of the crime programme AVRO Opsproring Verzocht. Later she worked for RTV Noord-Holland, Amsterdam FM, SBS Hart van Nederland and since 2007 for commercial newsstation BNR Nieuwsradio. In 2008 she was added to the team of newsanchors for the NOS Journaal. She presented morning and afternoon bulletins and also worked as contributing editor for foreign affairs. Since 2018 Abid works in PR and communication for the Netherlands branch of ViacomCBS to promote the American shows of channels like Spike and MTV.

In 2011 Abid was voted number 88 on a list of the 100 "most powerful Arab women".

References

1977 births
Living people
People from Meknes
HU University of Applied Sciences Utrecht alumni